Susan Palwick (born 1960 in New York City) is an American writer and associate professor emerita of English at the University of Nevada, Reno. She began her professional career by publishing "The Woman Who Saved the World" for Isaac Asimov's Science Fiction Magazine in 1985.

Raised in northern New Jersey, Palwick attended Princeton University, where she studied fiction writing with novelist Stephen Koch, and she holds a doctoral degree from Yale. In the 1980s, she was an editor of The Little Magazine and then helped found The New York Review of Science Fiction, to which she contributed several reviews and essays. Although she is not a prolific author, Palwick's work has received multiple awards, including the Rhysling Award (in 1985) for her poem "The Neighbor's Wife." She won the Crawford Award for best first novel with Flying in Place in 1993, and the Alex Award in 2006 for her second novel, The Necessary Beggar. Her third novel, Shelter, was published by Tor in 2007.  Another book, The Fate of Mice (a collection of short stories), has also been published by Tachyon Publications.

Susan Palwick is a practicing Episcopalian and lay preacher. For many years, she wrote a column for the Church Health Center's website on faith and health, HopeandHealing.org.  As of 2019, she worked as a hospital chaplain in Reno.

Bibliography

Novels

Collections

Short fiction 

=== Poetry Collections ===
Brief Visits: Sonnets from a Volunteer Chaplain (2012)

References

External links
 Susan Palwick's blog
 Review of The Fate of Mice, by Jo Walton
 Review of Shelter, by Jo Walton

1961 births
Living people
20th-century American non-fiction writers
20th-century American novelists
20th-century American women writers
21st-century American non-fiction writers
21st-century American novelists
21st-century American women writers
American academics of English literature
American women non-fiction writers
American women novelists
Asimov's Science Fiction people
Princeton University alumni
Rhysling Award for Best Short Poem winners
Women science fiction and fantasy writers
Writers from Nevada
Yale University alumni